Hell City Glamours were a hard rock band from Sydney, Australia. They supported the likes of Paul Stanley, New York Dolls, Sebastian Bach, Alice Cooper, Shihad, and Airbourne. They released three EP's, a split 7" single with the Devilrock Four and were responsible for a resurgence in hard rock/rock n roll in Sydney in the early 2000s. In late 2008 Hell City Glamours supported The Angels on their Night Attack tour which included four special shows with Rose Tattoo and released their debut album in Europe on Classic Rock Magazine's "Powerage" label. In March, 2009 Hell City Glamours completed their first tour of the United States in which they played at Aussie BBQ and SXSW. In April 2014 they announced the release of their second  and final self-titled album along with dates for their farewell tour. Whilst never receiving any support from radio, the Hell City Glamours were an incredibly popular live draw, known for their often sold-out, raucous live shows.

Band members
Mo Mayhem (guitar) 
Oscar McBlack (vocals, guitar) 
Robbie Potts (drums) 
Jono Barwick (bass) 
Archi Fires (bass - former member)

Discography

Albums
Hell City Glamours (2008)
Same (2014)

EPs
Les Infideles (2004)
Broken Glass Beatless Hearts (2005)
Hey Man (2006)

References

External links
Official website
Hell City Glamours Get Messy In Final Canberra Show photos by Cole Bennetts at The Music.com.au

Australian hard rock musical groups
New South Wales musical groups